Dean Blore (born 29 September 1998) is an Australian professional rugby league footballer who plays as a  for the St George Illawarra Dragons in the NSW Cup.

Background
Blore was born in Sydney, Australia.
Blore played his junior rugby league for Brothers Penrith. He is of Samoan, New Zealand and Australian descent.
He attended Hills Sports High School.

Playing career
Blore was selected to represent the Junior Kiwis in 2018, playing against his brother Shawn, who represented the Junior Kangaroos.

Blore represented Samoa in the 2019 Rugby League World Cup 9s.

Penrith Panthers
Blore was released at the end of the 2020 season.

References

External links
Dean Blore Panthers profile 

1998 births
Living people
Australian people of New Zealand descent
Australian sportspeople of Samoan descent
Australian rugby league players
Junior Kiwis players
Rugby league five-eighths
Rugby league players from Sydney
Samoa national rugby league team players